Protein farnesyltransferase/geranylgeranyltransferase type-1 subunit alpha is an enzyme that in humans is encoded by the FNTA gene.

Prenyltransferases attach either a farnesyl group or a geranylgeranyl group in thioether linkage to the cysteine residue of protein's with a C-terminal CAAX box. CAAX geranylgeranyltransferase and CAAX farnesyltransferase are heterodimers that share the same alpha subunit but have different beta subunits. This gene encodes the alpha subunit of these transferases. Alternative splicing results in multiple transcript variants encoding different isoforms.

Interactions
FNTA has been shown to interact with TGF beta receptor 1.

References

Further reading

External links